The 2013 World Junior Ice Hockey Championship Division II was played in two groups of six teams each. In each group the first-placed team is promoted to a higher level, while the last-placed team is relegated to a lower level. Divisions II A and II B represent the fourth and the fifth tier of the World Junior Ice Hockey Championships.

Division II A
The Division II A tournament was played in Brașov, Romania, from 9 to 15 December 2012.

Participants

Officials

Referees
  Alexei Belov
  Chris Deweerdt
  Per Gustav Solem
  Jens Steinecke

Linesmen
  Edvards Briedis
  Mihai Butucel
  Jan Cerne
  Dmitry Golyak
  Tomislav Grozaj
  Wojciech Moszczynski
  Adrian Cosmin Toparceanu

Final standings

Results
All times are local. (Eastern European Time – UTC+2)

Statistics

Top 10 scorers

Goaltending leaders
(minimum 40% team's total ice time)

Awards

Best Players Selected by the Directorate
 Goaltender:  Zoltan Toke
 Defenceman:  Hiroto Sato
 Forward:  Roberto Gliga

Best players of each team selected by the coaches
  Pablo Puyuelo
  Krisztián Nagy
  Yuto Osawa
  Aimas Fiscevas
  Danny Stempher
  Zsombor Molnar

Division II B
The Division II B tournament was played in Belgrade, Serbia, from 12 to 18 January 2013.

Participants

Officials

Referees
  Aleksandrs Borisovs
  Jean Paul De Brabander
  Michele Gastaldelli
  Maksyn Urda

Linesmen
  Uros Aleksic
  Markus Hagerstrom
  Benjamin Hoppe
  Miroslav Lhotsky
  Rudy Meyer Dainow
  David Parduv
  Jeroen Van den Berg

Final standings

Results
All times are local. (Central European Time – UTC+1)

Statistics

Top 10 scorers

Goaltending leaders
(minimum 40% team's total ice time)

Awards

Best Players Selected by the Directorate
 Goaltender:  Peter Stepanovic
 Defenceman:  Mark Taru
 Forward:  Robert Rooba

References

External links
IIHF.com

World Junior Ice Hockey Championships – Division II, 2012
II
World Junior Ice Hockey Championships – Division II
International ice hockey competitions hosted by Romania
International ice hockey competitions hosted by Serbia
World
World